The House of Trolle (sometimes in Danish Trold) is the name of a Scanian noble family, originally from Småland, in Sweden. The family has produced prominent people in the histories of Denmark and in Sweden since the Middle Ages and is associated with several estates in both countries.

Family history

Historically attested male-line family members are known as far back as the 14th century. The earliest was the knight Birger Knutsson, also known as Birghe Trulle. The earliest known generations held the estate of Bo in Småland, Sweden. Birger Trolle, High Councillor of Sweden, inherited Bergkvara castle from his half-brother Håkan Karlsson.

Arvid Birgersson and Eric Arvidsson were among mightiest in the country and both almost became Regents of Sweden in their time, in competition against the Sture family. Gustav Trolle was Archbishop of Uppsala. The original Swedish line of the family died out in the late 16th century.

Eric's younger half-brother Joachim (d 1546) inherited Lilloe in Skåne from his mother and settled in Denmark. The Danish family line continued through his relations, becoming an important house of high nobility. One of his sons was Danish admiral Herluf Trolle and one of great-grandsons, Niels Trolle (Nils Trolle til Trollesholm og Gavnø), was Statholder of Norway.

Sweden again had a branch of the family when Niels Trolle's son Arvid Nielsen Trold, Lord of Trollenäs Castle, swore loyalty to Sweden (and was in 1689 given a seat among Sweden's nobility) after Skåne, his native land, had become a permanent part of Sweden. The head of the House received in 1816 by primogeniture the hereditary title of baron in Sweden for the House. All currently extant branches of the House of Trolle descend from him; the remaining Danish branches exist in Denmark.

Coat of arms
The family name comes from the family coat of arms that depicts a headless troll. According to tradition, the family had taken these arms on the basis of a legend that a common ancestor must have killed a troll and robbed a drinking horn, which was called Våxtorpshornet el.

Prominent family members
Denmark
Herluf Trolle (1516–1565),  Danish naval hero
 Niels Trolle, vice admiral
 Mette Trolle

Sweden
Eric Trolle (c. 1460–1530), Swedish Lord High Constable
Gustav Trolle (1488–1535),  Archbishop of Uppsala
Frederik Trolle (1693-1770) Owner of Trolleholms Castle 
Nils Axel Arvid Carlsson Trolle (1859-1930), Baron of Trollenäs Castle
Ulf Trolle Managing Director of Trollenäs Gods AB

See also
Trolleholm Castle
Trolle-Ljungby Castle
Trollenäs Castle

References

External links
Trollenäs Castle official website